Miss World Singapore is a Singapore beauty pageant and the only national pageant in Singapore televised on Mediacorp Channel 5.

Titleholders

Singapore's representative at Miss World 

The winner of Miss World Singapore represents her country at Miss World. On occasion, when the winner does not qualify (due to age) for either contest, a runner-up is sent.

See also
Mister Singapore
Miss Singapore Universe
Miss Singapore International
Miss Earth Singapore

References

External links
Miss World Singapore

Beauty pageants in Singapore
Singapore
Annual events in Singapore
Recurring events established in 1972
1972 establishments in Singapore
Singaporean awards